Barthes most commonly refers to Roland Barthes (1915–1980), French philosopher and literary theorist.

Barthes may also refer to:
Barthes, Paul Joseph Barthez
Joana Barthes
Les Barthes, village and commune in the Tarn-et-Garonne département of France
Pierre Barthès (born 1941), French tennis player
Yann Barthès (born 1974), French journalist

See also
Barth (disambiguation)
Barthe (disambiguation)

Occitan-language surnames